The 1847 Vermont gubernatorial election took place on September 7, 1847, and resulted in the reelection of Whig Party candidate Horace Eaton to another one-year term as governor.

Results

References

1847
Vermont
Gubernatorial
September 1847 events